László Horváth (born 23 February 1988 in Kaposvár) is a Hungarian football player who currently plays for Kazincbarcikai SC.

Club statistics

Updated to games played as of 19 May 2019.

References
Player profile at HLSZ 

1988 births
Living people
People from Kaposvár
Hungarian footballers
Association football goalkeepers
Kaposvári Rákóczi FC players
Kaposvölgye VSC footballers
Szigetszentmiklósi TK footballers
Balmazújvárosi FC players
MTK Budapest FC players
Kazincbarcikai SC footballers
Nemzeti Bajnokság I players
Nemzeti Bajnokság II players
Sportspeople from Somogy County
21st-century Hungarian people